Prasadani Maheshika Weerakkody (born 13 November 1988) is a Sri Lankan cricketer who has played in 43 women's One Day Internationals, 25 Twenty20 internationals. In October 2021, she was named in Sri Lanka's team for the 2021 Women's Cricket World Cup Qualifier tournament in Zimbabwe. In January 2022, she was named in Sri Lanka's team for the 2022 Commonwealth Games Cricket Qualifier tournament in Malaysia.

References

1988 births
Living people
Place of birth missing (living people)
Sri Lankan women cricketers
Sri Lanka women One Day International cricketers
Sri Lanka women Twenty20 International cricketers